Jacob ben Joseph Harofe (Ya'aqov ben Yosef the Doctor) (c. 1780 – October 2, 1851), also known as Yaakov bar Yosef, was a 19th-century Talmudic scholar and dayan (rabbinic court judge) in Baghdad, Iraq. He was considered one of the greatest Torah scholars of his generation. He authored many Torah novellae, homiletics, and commentaries. His most notable disciple was Hakham Abdallah Somekh.

Biography

Few biographical details are known about him. He studied under Rabbis Moshe Hayyim, Reuven Nawi, and Nissim Mashliah. 

In 1848 he was visited by the Romanian-Jewish traveler Benjamin II, who called him: "Highly respected, by virtue of his fine qualities and broad knowledge".

He died in a cholera epidemic on October 2, 1851. He was buried in the courtyard of the tomb of Joshua the High Priest in Baghdad.

His son, Joseph, also became a Talmudic scholar; he died on October 21, 1877. A daughter, Esther, married Rabbi Moshe Hayim Shlomo David Shamash, who later became the chief rabbi of the Iraqi community.

Selected bibliography
Prayer Book for Sabbath with a commentary on Canticles
Shir Hadash (commentary on the Song of Songs)
Nava Tehilla
Shemen Hatov (on Maseches Beitza)

References

1780 births
1851 deaths
Year of birth uncertain
19th-century Iraqi rabbis
Rabbis from Baghdad